{{DISPLAYTITLE:Technetium (99mTc) sulesomab}}

Technetium (99mTc) sulesomab (trade name LeukoScan) is a radio-pharmaceutical composed of anti-human mouse monoclonal antibody that targets the granulocyte associated NCA-90 cell antigen and a conjugated technetium-99m radionuclide. After intravenous administration, Leukoscan enables sensitive and specific whole body  measurement of granulocyte infiltration and activation by gamma camera imaging of  99mTc-antibody bound cells. Total clearance of LeukoScan from blood samples after administration and imaging has been reported at 48 hour time points indicating limited retention of the agent in circulation

It is approved in European markets for the imaging of infections and inflammations in patients with suspected osteomyelitis but has not secured FDA approval for use in American markets. In addition to approved uses, Leukoscan is  currently being investigated for other diagnostic purposes like the detection of soft tissue infections, malignant external otitis and prosthetic joint infection. However, the future clinical and investigational use of this agent may be limited as sale of the agent by the parent company Immunomedics was discontinued in 2018.

References

See also 
 Immunoscintigraphy
 Nuclear medicine

Radiopharmaceuticals
Technetium-99m
Antibody-drug conjugates
Technetium compounds